Adamair (Adammair, Adhamair, Amadir), son of Fer Corb, was, according to medieval Irish legends and historical traditions, a High King of Ireland. He came from Munster, killed the previous incumbent, Ailill Caisfhiaclach, and reigned for five years, until he was killed by Eochaid Ailtleathan. The Lebor Gabála Érenn synchronises his reign with that of Ptolemy V Epiphanes in Egypt (204–181 BC). The chronology of the Annals of the Four Masters dates his reign to 418–414 BC, the chronology of Geoffrey Keating's Foras Feasa ar Éirinn to 290–285 BC. He was the husband of the presumed goddess Flidais of the Tuatha Dé Danann.

References

Legendary High Kings of Ireland
3rd-century BC rulers
Regicides
Usurpers
3rd-century BC murdered monarchs